Dominican passport may refer to:
Dominican Republic passport, issued to citizens of the Dominican Republic
Dominica passport, issued to citizens of the Commonwealth of Dominica

Passports by country